Vešenik is a settlement in the Municipality of Slovenske Konjice in eastern Slovenia. It lies in the hills immediately northeast of Slovenske Konjice. The area is part of the traditional region of Styria. When statistical regions were created in Slovenia in 2007, the Municipality of Slovenske Konjice was included in the Savinja Statistical Region.

References

External links
Vešenik at Geopedia

Populated places in the Municipality of Slovenske Konjice